Big Sandy Superstore is a regional furniture store chain with stores located in West Virginia, Indiana, Kentucky, Michigan, Missouri, and Ohio. In 1953, Big Sandy Superstore was founded in Ashland, Kentucky by Robert Van Hoose, Sr. Today the company is one of the nation's top 100 furniture retailers, with 600 employees and operating 16 stores. The company's corporate headquarters and distribution center is located in Wheelersburg, Scioto County, Ohio. Big Sandy purchased the naming rights to the Huntington Civic Arena in Huntington, West Virginia in 2004, renaming it the Big Sandy Superstore Arena. As of 09/2019 Big Sandy Superstore is a privately held company. In 2020, the company expanded outside its core area, opening a stores in Evansville, Mishawaka in Indiana, Cadillac, Gaylord, Midland, Mt. Pleasant,  Owosso in Michigan, and Cape Girardeau in Missouri.

Big Sandy Outlet Centers
Ashland

References

External links
Big Sandy Superstore
Dyer's Big Sandy Superstore
Big Sandy Arena

Retail companies based in Pennsylvania
Retail companies based in Ohio
Retail companies based in Kentucky
1953 establishments in Kentucky
Retail companies established in 1953